Thomas Watson (1870 – April 1902) was an English footballer who played in the Football League for Small Heath as a goalkeeper.

Watson was born in the Yardley Wood district of Birmingham. He grew up to be an all-round athlete, and was actively involved in organising local athletics meetings. He played for Small Heath as an amateur, making two appearances in the First Division in the 1894–95 season. Watson's debut came on 2 March 1895, deputising for regular goalkeeper Charles Partridge in a home game against Blackburn Rovers which finished as a 1–1 draw. In the next, and his last, game Small Heath conceded five goals to Derby County.

Watson joined Birmingham City Police in 1895, rising to the rank of sergeant, played for their football team, and often used to police Small Heath's matches. He died in Birmingham in 1902.

References

1870 births
1902 deaths
Footballers from Birmingham, West Midlands
English footballers
Association football goalkeepers
Birmingham City F.C. players
English Football League players
British police officers
Date of birth missing
Birmingham City Police